Pascale Déry is a Canadian politician, who was elected to the National Assembly of Quebec in the 2022 Quebec general election. She represents the riding of Repentigny as a member of the Coalition Avenir Québec.

She was formerly a television journalist for TVA and Le Canal Nouvelles. She sought the Conservative Party of Canada nomination for Mount Royal in the 2015 Canadian federal election, losing to Robert Libman.

References

21st-century Canadian politicians
21st-century Canadian women politicians
Coalition Avenir Québec MNAs
Women MNAs in Quebec
Canadian television news anchors
Canadian television reporters and correspondents
Canadian women television journalists
Living people
French Quebecers
Journalists from Quebec
Year of birth missing (living people)